Giuseppe Ardizzone (17 February 1947) was an Italian long-distance runner, who was 6th in the 5000 m at the 1969 European Athletics Championships. 

Two-time national champion at senior level.

Career
Ardizzone between 1966 and 1973 was one of the best Italians in the middle distance/cross-country running sector. He held the national records of 3000 meters (7:59.6 in 1968) and 10,000 meters (29:04.2 in 1970).

National records
 3000 metres: 7:59.6 ( Rome, 31 August 1968) - record holder until 11 August 1970.
 10,000 metres: 29:04.2 ( Madrid, 31 May 1970) - record holder until 1 May 1971.
 25,000 metres: 1:17:28.2 ( Busto Arsizio, 13 November 1971) - record holder until 30 October 1977.

Achievements

See also
 Italy at the 1969 European Athletics Championships

References

External links
 

1947 births
Living people
Italian male long-distance runners
Italian male marathon runners
Italian male cross country runners
Sportspeople from Catania
Athletics competitors of Fiamme Gialle